This is a list of commemorative postage stamps issued by the India Post between 1971 and 1980.

1971

1972

1973

1974

1975

1976

1977

1978

1979

1980

References

External links
 Catalogue of Indian Postage Stamps

Postage stamps of India
India